Boan (Buan, Ababuan) is a proposed intermediate group of Bantu languages coded Zones C and D in Guthrie's classification. There are three branches:

Komo (D20)
Bali (D20), ?Beeke
Bomokandian (the various Bwa and Biran languages)
Biran (Bira–Amba) (D22, D30)
Homa (Ngenda) (D40)
Lika (D20)
Bati–Angba (Bwa) (C40)

Beeke is an erstwhile member of the Nyali cluster that seems to be closest to Bali.

In the Glottolog 2.3 classification, several additional, poorly attested languages are included as being closest to Homa/Ngenda:

Bali (D20)
Old Bomokandian
Komoic (Biran, incl. Komo)
Middle Bomokandian (Lika & Bati–Angba)
Ngbele–Ngenda
Extreme-north Vestigial-suffix Bantu: Kari, Ngbee, Nyanga-li (Gbati-ri)
Ngendan
Homa, Ngbinda, ?Boguru, ?Bodo (perhaps instead Lebonya)

References